The 1994 Grand Prix Hassan II men's singles competition. Renzo Furlan was the champion, defeating Karim Alami 6–2, 6–2. Guillermo Pérez Roldán was the defending champion.

Seeds

Draw

Finals

Section 1

Section 2

References

External links
 Main draw

Singles